Monochroa bronzella is a moth of the family Gelechiidae. It is found in the south-western Alps of France and north-western Italy. The habitat consists of steppic and xerothermic slopes.

The wingspan is 13–16 mm for males and about 9 mm for females. The forewings are dark bronze fuscous. The hindwings are grey. Adults have been recorded on wing from late May to late July.

Etymology
The species name refers to its uniformly bronze-coloured forewings.

References

Moths described in 2013
Monochroa
Moths of Europe